Grand Chord is part of the Howrah–Gaya–Delhi line and Howrah–Allahabad–Mumbai line. It acts as a link between Sitarampur, (Asansol), (West Bengal) and Pt. The Coal India Corridor line that branches off from Dhanbad Junction and rejoins the Grand Chord at Son Nagar Junction is another major coal loading hub. It is a fully electrified, triple line section from Pt. Deen Dayal Upadhyay to Son Nagar and double line section from Son Nagar to Sitarampur . There are plans to triple the lines from Son Nagar to Dhanbad to accommodate the increasing traffic.  . The entire line lies under the jurisdiction of three divisions, Mughalsarai railway division , Dhanbad railway division and Asansol railway division. The Grand chord section is the lifeline of the country, 2nd busiest railway section of India after Ghaziabad, Uttar Pradesh to Pt. Deen Dayal Upadhyay Junction, Uttar Pradesh (previously known as Mughalsarai Junction) Main Line section, on which coal, steel and other important goods are moved from Eastern section to Western and Northern sections of the country. In the down direction, the traffic consists of mostly food grains, fertilizers and empty wagons for coal loading in the Jharkhand and West Bengal coal fields. Pt. Deen Dayal Upadhyay Junction is a transit division and the main objective is to maintain mobility of high density traffic. The present capacity of the Grand Chord is being optimally utilized. The Grand Chord is renowned for its remarkable controlling of passenger traffic, despite being burdened with freight traffic.

With the increase in traffic it became necessary to construct an alternative route.

With this in view, the Grand Chord section was planned. The Grand Chord section was opened in December 1906 by Lord Minto, then Viceroy and Governor-General of India with a function at Gujahandi.

The Grand Chord section is critically important even today, handling major passenger trains on the Howrah–Delhi route, particularly all the Rajdhani Expresses from Howrah, Bhubaneswar and Ranchi and the entire freight traffic, particularly coal, handled by the Dhanbad division of East Central Railway.

Eastern Dedicated Freight Corridor
The Eastern Dedicated Freight Corridor (EDFC) encompasses a double-line electrified traction corridor from Haldia on the Eastern Railway to Khurja on the North Central Railway via Grand Chord, Khurja to Dadri on NCR double-line electrified corridor and Single electrified line from Khurja to Ludhiana on Northern Railway. So in the Grand Chord section its total 4 parallel track will be run to ease traffic movement on this busy route.

The EDFC will traverse 6 states and is projected to cater to a number of traffic streams – coal for the power plants in the northern region of Uttar Pradesh, Delhi, Haryana, Punjab and parts of Rajasthan from the Eastern coal fields, finished steel, food grains, cement, fertilizers, limestone from Rajasthan to steel plants in the east and general goods. The total traffic in UP direction is projected to go up from 38 million tonnes in FY2005-06 to 116 million tonnes in FY2021–22.

Trains on the route
In , it was said that a goods train passes by every 20 minutes on the Grand Chord line. Now, the frequency has become around 5 minutes making it one of the busiest routes in India. More than 50 mail and express trains use this shorter route apart from 2 dozens of passenger trains.

Some important trains on the route 
 Howrah Rajdhani Express (via Gaya)
 Sealdah Rajdhani Express
 Bhubaneswar Rajdhani Express (via Bokaro, Tatanagar)
 Bhubaneswar Rajdhani Express (via Adra)
 Bhubaneswar Rajdhani Express (via Sambalpur)
 Ranchi Rajdhani Express (via Bokaro, Gaya)
 Ranchi Rajdhani Express (via Daltonganj)
 Howrah–Ranchi Shatabdi Express (via Bokaro, Dhanbad)
 Howrah–New Delhi Duronto Express
 Bhubaneswar–Duronto Express
 Ranchi–New Delhi Garib Rath Express
 Howrah–Anand Vihar Yuva Express
 West Bengal Sampark Kranti Express
 Odisha Sampark Kranti Express
 Jharkhand Sampark Kranti Express
 Gaya–Anand Vihar Garib Rath Express
 Howrah–Jodhpur Express
 Ajmer–Sealdah Express
 Kalka Mail – The oldest running passenger train of India
 Poorva Express (via Gaya)
 Garbha Express
 Howrah–Jaisalmer Superfast Express
 Purushottam Express
 Parasnath Express
 Howrah–Gwalior Chambal Express
 Howrah–Agra Cantt/Mathura Chambal Express
 Howrah–Indore Junction Shipra Express
 Jharkhand Swarna Jayanti Express (via Bokaro)
 Mahabodhi Express
 Deekshabhoomi Express
 Sealdah–Bikaner Duronto Express
 Gaya–Chennai Egmore Weekly Superfast Express
 Howrah–Bhopal Weekly Express
 Doon Express
 Neelachal Express (Via. Bokaro)
 Nandankanan Express (Via. Adra)
 Patna–Hatia Express
 Shalimar (Howrah) Express
 Pratap Express
 Black Diamond Express
 Coalfield Express
 Patna - Ranchi Janshatabdi Express
 Purnia Court - Hatia Kosi Express
 Sealdah–Amritsar Jallianwalla Bagh Express
 Tatanagar–Amritsar Jallianwalla Bagh Express		
 Kolkata Mail via Allahabad
 Ganga Damodar Express
 Ganga Sutlej Express
 Garib Nawaz Express
 Howrah–Ranchi Intercity Express via Adra
 Dhanbad–Patna Intercity Express
 Dhanbad–Gaya Intercity Express
 Patna–Bhabua Road Intercity Express
 Howrah–Ranchi Intercity Express  via Tatanagar
 Ranchi–Varanasi Express
 Ranchi–Kamakhya Express
 Shaktipunj Express
 Haldia–Anand Vihar Terminal Superfast Express
 Bhubaneswar–Anand Vihar Weekly Superfast Express via Sambalpur, Rourkela, Bokaro
 Shabd Bhedi Superfast Express
 Howrah–Lalkuan Express
 Durgiana Express
 Kolkata–Agra Cantonment Express
 Kolkata–Agra Cantonment Superfast Express
 Santragachi–Anand Vihar Superfast Express

References

5 ft 6 in gauge railways in India
Rail transport in West Bengal
Rail transport in Jharkhand
Railway lines in Bihar
Railway lines in Uttar Pradesh
Railway lines opened in 1907
1907 establishments in India